Protas is a surname. Notable people with the surname include:

 Aliaksei Protas (born 2001), Belarusian ice hockey player
 Ron Protas, American dance company director

See also
 
 Protasevich